Benziane Senouci (born October 5, 1981 in El Amria) is an Algerian football player who is currently playing as a defender for MC Oran in the Algerian Ligue Professionnelle 1.

Honours
 Won the Algerian Ligue Professionnelle 1 twice:
 Once with MC Alger in 2010
 Once with ASO Chlef in 2011

References

1981 births
Algerian footballers
Algerian Ligue Professionnelle 1 players
ASM Oran players
ASO Chlef players
MC Alger players
MC Saïda players
MC Oran players
Living people
People from El Amria
USM Blida players
Association football defenders
21st-century Algerian people